Áedh Ó Flaithbheartaigh, Taoiseach of Iar Connacht and Chief of the Name, fl. c. 1377?-1407.

Reign

Few details appear to be known of him, he being the first of the family to appear in the annals since the time of Ruaidhri Ó Flaithbheartaigh.

He built the church at Annaghdown in 1410 - the monastery of Annaghdown was burned in 1413 - and was succeeded by his son, Domnell.

Annalistic references

 1384. A meeting, took place between O'Flaherty and O'Malley, but a quarrel arose between them, in which Owen O'Malley, Cormac O'Malley (i.e. Cormac Cruinn), and many others besides these, were slain by the people of O'Flaherty.
 1396. Conor, the son of Owen O'Malley, went on an incursion with a ship's crew to West Connaught, and loaded the ship with the riches and prizes taken by that adventure. But all, save one man only, were drowned between Ireland and Aran.
 1402. Brian, the son of Donnell O'Flaherty, heir to the lordship of Carn Gegach, died.
 1407. Hugh O'Flaherty, Lord of West Connaught, died at an advanced age.

See also

 Ó Flaithbertaigh

References

 West or H-Iar Connaught Ruaidhrí Ó Flaithbheartaigh, 1684 (published 1846, ed. James Hardiman).
 Origin of the Surname O'Flaherty, Anthony Matthews, Dublin, 1968, p. 40.
 CELT: Corpus of Electronic Texts at University College Cork

People from County Galway
Medieval Gaels from Ireland
1407 deaths
Aedh
14th-century Irish people
15th-century Irish people
Year of birth unknown
Irish lords